Ruth Lake is spring-fed lake located in Nipissing Township, in the Almaguin Highlands region of Parry Sound District, Ontario, Canada.

See also
List of lakes in Ontario

References
 National Resources Canada

Lakes of Parry Sound District